Mon Colle Knights, known in Japan as , is a Japanese manga series written by Satoru Akahori and Katsumi Hasegawa and illustrated by Hideaki Nishikawa. The original concept was made by Hitoshi Yasuda and Group SNE. The series is based on the Monster Collection trading card game.

An anime television series adaptation animated by Studio Deen aired on TV Tokyo from January to December 2000 and consisted of 51 episodes and one film. The Saban-produced Mon Colle Knights aired on Fox Kids in North America from July 2001 to September 2002, consisting of 45 episodes. In 2006, it aired in reruns on Toon Disney's Jetix on Sundays, as part of Jetix's "Anime Invasion Sundays" block. The manga was published in English in Singapore by Chuang Yi.

On June 9, 2020, the original Japanese version became available on Crunchyroll via Discotek Media. According to Justin Sevakis, the only reason why the anime was only available on Crunchyroll in Japanese is that the masters for the English dub couldn't be found. Discotek Media asked fans to help find the masters. They were still searching for it as of September 15, 2020. Discotek Media released the anime sub-only on Blu-ray on April 27, 2021. However, Discotek Media promised that they were still looking for the English dub. Discotek had found the English dub masters and released the English dub on Blu-ray on May 31, 2022.

Plot

The series features Mondo Ooya and his classmate/girlfriend Rockna Hiiragi (Rokuna in the Japanese version), whose scientist father Professor Ichiroubei Hiiragi invented a way to travel to Mon World (Roku Mon Sekai: the Six Gate World), where all sorts of magical creatures live. Together, they try to find six monster items which, when combined, could connect the Six Gate World with planet Earth for the better of both worlds. Rokuna and Mondo form the Mon Colle Knights and find out that when chanting a phrase-("With us, you can do it!") they can merge into monsters and control them into battle as well as aid with spells. Almost every episode, they battle Professor Hiiragi's rival Prince Eccentro (Count Collection in the Japanese version) and his two girl underlings Gluko and Batch (Goruko and Bachi in the Japanese version) who are after the same thing as the Mon Colle Knights, except that they intend to use the items to dominate both worlds.

Main characters

Mon Colle Knights
 
 
 One of the main protagonists of the series and is an elementary school student at a local public school. Mondo is an adventurous young boy who seeks to gather the Mon items to bring together his world and Mon world for peace and friendship. Even though he has an outgoing and determined nature, Mondo has a little problem: he always flirts with pretty girls (Beginner, Kahimi, and Lailai are the most notable). Note that the first Kanji in Mondo's name; "," is the same that is used in the Mon Colle Knights title, . He has devices that he uses for his peace sign attack.

  / Rockna Hiiragi
 
 One of the main protagonists of the series. Rokuna is Mondo's genius friend and classmate from school, whose intentions match Mondo's. She has a special telepathic ability to communicate with monsters. Now her boyfriend Mondo likes drooling over her but she gets jealous if Mondo flirts with other girls causing Rokuna to attack him. The first Kanji in Rockna's name; "," is the same that is used in the Mon Colle Knights title, . She has a baton like devices which she uses for her string or ribbon attack.

 
 
 Rokuna's father and a rather eccentric sort of mad scientist. He discovered Mon World and wants the human world to know about it so he can win many awards. His laboratory is right across the street from Mondo and Rokuna's school.

  / Lovestar
 
 Lovestar is a Zeechi that Rokuna adopted. A pale pink hamster-like monster with a red star marked on its back. In the Japanese version, their species is called "Lovestar" because the sounds the creatures make resemble the word "love-love" and the pattern on their backs make a star. Also in the Japanese version, Lovestar is called "Jāne," because, when Rokuna was trying to say goodbye ("Jā ne") to it, Lovestar thought she was calling it by name.

 
 
 A tiny monkey monster who punches.

 Cluckputer
 Professor Hiiragi's chicken-based super computer. It usually serves as a computer for Professor Hiiragi and goes off by making chicken noises whenever a monster is nearby.

Collection team
  / Prince Ludwig Von Monsterstein Eccentro
 
 One of the principal antagonists of the series. Prince Eccentro is a young effeminate aristocrat from Europe who wants to take over Mon World. He was born in 1974 and he was trained by Tanaka when his father wanted him to be a bad guy. He is not very threatening due to his eccentric behavior and hysterical persona at times. However, he is the inventor of the hypnotic Skeitso Beam (whether on his Flying Lion aircraft or Teddyarenaut) which he uses to bend monsters to his will. Because of that, he tends to have his evil moments, though he really isn't as evil as he brags himself to be. Everytime Prince Eccentro fails, Tanaka would punish him with back-breaking exercises and/or harsh training that is related to the episode's content. His dream is apparently to become a world famous belly dancer.

 Teddyarenaut
 A bear-like computer created by Eccentro. He serves as the counterpart to the Cluckputer and has a built-in Skeitso Beam. In one episode, he temporarily developed an A.I. because Savant Bear thought he was their king.

  / Batch
 
 Eccentro's tomboyish lackey, with a brash, spunky, and often sarcastic personality. She tends to be much more committed to evil deeds than the foppish Eccentro or the air-headed Gluko. Batch unfortunately gets punished by Tanaka as well except in two episodes. Batch and Eccentro argue a lot, and sometimes Batch shows amusement at Eccentro's mishaps. Ultimately they have a trusting and friendly relationship though, and Batch always follows the Count's orders. She is shown to be a fitness enthusiast, as her bedroom is filled with exercise equipment. In the Japanese version, she speaks with a distinct Kansai dialect.

  / Gluko
 
 Eccentro's big-breasted, yet air-headed and friendly underling. She is always spared by Tanaka when it is time for punishment and has an amount of luck. Goruko never seems to get hurt while the rest of her team and the Mon Colle Knights usually does. An English ongoing joke in the series is that during Eccentro's launch sequence in each episode, she asks a very long and logic based question which ends with Eccentro and Batch becoming bored and saying "Never mind, Goruko." In the Japanese version, Gluko speaks in a very polite and respectful dialect whether she's talking to her teammates or her enemies. Goruko also carries around a book detailing about Mon World and his creatures. In a later episode, Gluko ends up adopting a Forest Imp named Impy.

  / Tanaka
 
 A midget old man who serves as Eccentro's mentor under the orders of Eccentro's father. He usually punishes Eccentro for his screw ups (and/or lack of manly attitude) with back-breaking exercises and/or harsh training related to the episode's content. Tanaka tends to pop up anywhere.

  / Impy
 
 A cheerful young Forest Imp (Leprechaun in the Japanese version) who is Goruko's pet. Goruko first found him in the forest near where Vipress was imprisoned. Impy doesn't talk very much -- he usually only utters short, inquisitive questions (such as "What this?"), or repeats cheerfully what Goruko says. He has psychic powers that allow him to telekinetically move things around, which comes in handy for some of Eccentro's schemes. Impy also has a habit of fiddling with buttons on the Flying Lion aircraft and more often than not causing it to explode and send him and his allies blasting off. Despite his apparent carefree and dimwitted personality, Impy does care a lot for Goruko. A running gag sees him using his powers to switch Tanaka and Eccentro around in order for the latter to escape and make his attempt to conquer Mon World for the episode.

Supporting cast
  / Naomi Loon
 
 Mondo and Rokuna's teacher, a rather nice lady who has a short temper and terrible luck with love. For some reason, there is a monster card featuring her that is in Prince Eccentro's possession. She is a skilled fighter as seen in some episodes.

 
 
 A cute but accident-prone girl with a large appetite who is learning to become a summoner. While powerful, her aim is terrible, so she tends to hurt her allies by accident. As a running gag, she has a habit of summoning a giant meteor that always ends destroying something. She is a friend of Mondo and Rokuna. Her grandfather, Expert, runs the summoning school she attends. In the Japanese version, Beginner refers to Mondo and Rokuna collectively as "Roku-Mon-chan," much to their annoyance.

 
 
 A young girl which the Mon Colle Knights often encounter at random, while she travels the world carrying impossible amounts of little monsters in her coat. She gave Lovestar to Rokuna.

  / Kahimi
 
An elf maiden with very long hair, whose beauty incites Rokuna's jealousy whenever Mondo compliments Kahimi (though Rokuna holds nothing against Kahimi herself). She becomes a good friend and ally of the Mon Colle Knights, especially with her ability to make plants grow and control over the winds of Mon World.

 
 
 A friend of Beginner's who goes to the same summoning school as her. Luke has a poorly-disguised crush on Beginner and seems to like Rokuna. Luke is a summoning prodigy and considers Mondo his biggest rival as a monster summoner and for Beginner's heart. Around Beginner, Luke becomes so nervous he can summon only purple sheep, not to be confused with his own sheep friend, Lambda. Beginner, for her part, is oblivious to Luke's crush on her. Luke acts rather stingy and aloof towards strangers and he tends to be a bit of a crybaby when things don't go his way -- such as when someone, usually Mondo, interacts with Beginner or Lambda -- but he shows himself to quite brave in the face of danger, and his summoning abilities make him handy to have around. Prince Eccentro once lied to Luke telling him that Mondo is not a very good person causing Luke to summon Basilosaurus to attack Mondo with. Luke learned the truth when Prince Eccentro took over Basilosaurus.

 
 A purple sheep who is a friend of Luke's.

  / Gabriolis
 
 A former Light Angel. During a great war between good and evil, he was wounded and left behind by his friend Lark. He felt betrayed and abandoned and embraced the darkness that Redda offered him transforming him into a Dark Angel. He plagued the Mon Colle Knights on different occasions involving attacking Doppelganger and casting a spell on 3 of Mondo's cards (consisting of Forester the Forest Giant, Flying Stego, and Scorch the Fire Monster) until Spectra appeared and reversed the spell. When he was weakened by Vipress's attack during his fight with Mondo and Water Dragon after Redda took control of the monsters, it was later revealed by Spectra and the Angel of all Oceans that Lark, in fact, took his place in battle and died (in the English dub, he went to divert an approaching enemy flock and wasn't seen again) after which Gabriolis realized his error and reverted to good, though maintaining his dark appearance. He also helped Mondo and Rockna defeat Dread Dragon and destroyed Redda in the final episode. Zaha's name is derived from Zahariel, which means "Brightness of God". Zahariel was the angel who would help people resist temptation. This is both ironic and fitting to his character, as he would first failed to resist temptation, then become someone who temps others, then turns into someone who helps others resist temptation, and finally become someone who is able to resist it himself too. The English dubbed name is derived from Gabriel, one of the archangels who typically serves as a messenger to humans from God.

  / Lucca
 He is a small demonic creature who is Gabriolis' friend and partner. On one occasion, he had possession of an item that had to be won over in a Mon World Baseball tournament.

 
 
 One of the principal antagonists of the series. Redda is a fallen angel like Gabriolis, who wants to use the six items to summon Oroboros. He is powerful, but not the strongest. Redda would prefer to avoid battle when not having a good advantage. In the dub, he wants to create a world of nothingness. In the original, he wants to create a formless world where all souls are the same and neither good nor evil will exist. Redda was the one who enabled Gabriolis to embrace the darkness after he was seemingly abandoned. In the final battle, he is killed by Gabriolis.

 N-Nouncer
 A man with a circle that has the letter N on it. He serves as the announcer of any tournaments in Mon World.

  / Spectra the Angel
 
 Lark's sister and Zaha's fiance in the Japanese version (she is Gabriolis' sister in the English dub) who sports a long gold dress and is always barefoot. Spectra is a Light Angel who comes to Gabriolis in his darkest hour to show him what really happened in the past so he may find redemption. She reappeared when Redda was chasing after her near the Fire Angel's castle and was rescued by the Mon Colle Knights.

 Forest Angel / Earth Angel
 Mon World's guardian angel of the Earth Realm who sports five pairs of wings. She first appeared to help the Mon Colle Knights put the Four-Armed Giant back to sleep by summoning the Emerald Dragon. It was the Forest Angel who told the Mon Colle Knights of the Guardian Angels' roles.

 Flame Angel / Fire Angel
 
 The guardian angel of the Fire Realm and the Guardian of the Solar Scepter (one of the Mon items).

 Angel of all Oceans / Water Angel
 
 The guardian angel of the Water Realm and Guardian of the Arialla Pearl (one of the Mon items) who sports long purple hair, three wings, wears a strange dress, and is always barefoot. The Angel of all Oceans and Spectra revealed to Gabriolis what really happened the day when he was "abandoned."

 Cloud Angel
 Mon World's guardian angel of the Wind Realm who sports two pairs of wings.

Monsters
This is a list of all monsters featured in the anime Mon Colle Knights.

 Chimera - A three-headed monster that resemble a lion with dragon wings. It has a lion head, a maned lizard head, and a maned goat head where all three heads breathe fire. Prince Eccentro considers Chimera as one of his most powerful monsters.
 Squirt Fish - A small fish that can squirt water at its enemies. It comes in a variety of different sizes.
 Bisonator (Frenzied Bison in the Japanese version) - A powerful bison monster.
 Fog Dragon (Mist Dragon in the Japanese version) - A white dragon that uses fog to defend itself or hide in for protection. It looks like a plesiosaurus with turtle flippers and a nearly unseen shell on its back.
 Fish People - Mermaid-type monsters that have great singing voices.
 Gill Men - Anthropomorphic salamanders without tails that ride the waves and wield tridents.
 Toad Warrior (Poison Toad in the Japanese version) - A giant toad who isn't as tough as he looks, but he loves to eat flies.
 Cat King - A small humanoid white cat walking on his hind legs and wearing clothes. He rules a kingdom of similar cats.
 Ballerina Cat - A bit taller, more anthropomorphic feline with black fur and ballerina outfit, always speaking in rhyme.
 Sonic Condor - A giant condor monster that can fly very fast. It is a monster that has elements of both a phoenix and a roc.
 Flying Stego - A large purple dragon that seems to have a plane engine in its chest.
 Behemoth - A giant rhinoceros-like creature with a grey armored shell. He is Forester the Forest Giant's rival.
 Forester the Forest Giant - A giant who lives in the sandstone formations near the forest he protects. He hates violence unless if he has to defend himself. Forester is Behemoth's rival.
 Pegasus - A chibi winged horse that grew out into a full-fledged pegasus with Mondo's help. He remains a great and loyal friend to Mondo who cares deeply about him in return.
 Griffin (Hippogriff in the Japanese version) - A Hippogriff-type monsters, colored mostly black.
 War Hogs (Orcs in the Japanese version) - Anthropomorphic pigs who are at war with the Forest Elves. They are extremely lazy.
 Forest Elves - Elves in the simplest sense. It would seem their warriors are exclusively female and are led by Sonnet. They're rather afraid of dirt.
 Forest Elf King - The king of the aforementioned elves, unlike his warriors a gentle being.
 Rex - A Tyrannosaurus-type monster.
 Ogre Tribe - Inhabitants of the Fire Realm, they value strength very much and are not all too smart. Their main village has been accidentally destroyed by Beginner by summoning a giant meteor.
 Pose Brothers (Ogre Power Brothers in the Japanese version) - Two ogres who were paired up with Prince Eccentro in a tournament run by ogres.
 Airiphant - A small pink flying elephant who blows tornadoes after inhaling.
 Nighthawk Male - A dark brown giant bird. It was once controlled by Eccentro once to attack his own wife and nest.
 Nighthawk Female - A light brown giant bird.
 Leviathan - A large dark blue carp-like fish with sharp teeth.
 Water Dragon - A long blue water serpent-like creature that can create large tidal waves.
 Spectra Water Dragon - Water Dragon's evolved form.
 Count Dragula - A vampire spirit that possessed Eccentro, temporarily turning him into the epitome of manliness/evil that Tanaka tried to achieve in him. He has a number of evil minions that include zombies.
 Cave Wolves - Anthropomorphic wolves that use shovels to dig and hunt treasure. Not to be confused with werewolves.
 Rocky the Boulder - A boulder monster that goes after anything in sight.
 Underminers - Blue gnome-like creatures who don't seem to intelligent and spend their lives mining.
 King Pezno the Penguin - A penguin monster who uses his crown to summon monsters to his aid.
 Serpentine Slither - A giant serpent monster that resides in hot springs.
 Phoenix - A hybrid of a Valkyrie and a harpy. This humanoid has wings for arms and a great deal of Light Magic.
 Snow Ram - A ram/dragon monster who causes the winter in Mon World when not hibernating.
 Storm Dragon - A dark stone-blue dragon who has power over electricity. He has a son who Beginner accidentally summoned when the Snow Ram was causing a blizzard when it wasn't winter.
 Cyclone Storm Dragon - Storm Dragon's evolved form.
 Earth Dragon - A dull-green/brown Godzilla-like mimic (minus the plates on his back). He found the boots that enabled anyone flight. To earn them, a tournament occurred and he was the referee until Tanaka summoned him (Tanaka had a copy of the Earth Dragon's card). He lost the tournament and surrendered the boots, which turned out to be one of the Monster-Items.
 Emperor Earth Dragon - Earth Dragon's evolved stage.
 Sombrero Cactus - Living cacti with a sombrero, a guitar and a Mexican scarf. There is a female one with a pink dress.
 Giant Praying Mantis -
 Marvel Beetle -
 Dragonfly -
 Giant Waterbug -
 Volcano Shark -
 Arboreal Ancient - A large living tree with a face vaguely visible in its bast.
 Fire Butterfly - A giant spell-casting butterfly monster.
 Mirrorbug - A power draining parasitic beetle.
 Thunderbug - A white beetle that is the mirrorbug's natural enemy.
 Slobilonians - A race of Goblin-like men who eat a lot and they kidnap people to keep their home clean.
 Troll - A giant teal-skinned troll.
 Punch-Punch - Tiny monkey monsters who pack a punch when working together in groups.
 Snail Monster - A weak snail monster.
 Ripley Pine -
 Giant Flea -
 Garter Snake -
 Big Beetle -
 Goat Boy - A weak satyr-like monster.
 Jellyfish -
 Toilet Flush -
 Base - A bomb-like monster.
 Mushroom Head - A weak mushroom-topped monster.
 Tiger-Man - A man who can become a humanoid tiger when angered.
 Sparrow Squad - Three small in-training valkyrie girls that ride huge sparrows.
 Winged Warrior - A female warrior that rides a large swan.
 Centaurs - Horses with human torsos and horns. They seem to have a culture similar to that of the Native Americans.
 Centaur King ( King of 100 Battles) - The massive king of all Centaurs who had never lost a battle.
 Pythonic Viper - A large sight sensitive serpent.
 Nine-Headed Swamp Dragon (Swamp Hydra in the English dub) - A Hydra-type monster.
 Toxic Phantoms - Skull-faced reapers that drain the energy of their victims.
 Dopplefanger (Orthros in the Japanese version) - An Orthrus-type monster.
 Rhino Rex (Idiot Rhino in the Japanese version) - Basically, a slightly larger rhinoceros monster who is not very bright.
 Cycloptus (Cyclops in the Japanese version) - A Cyclops-type monster from the Earth Realm with psychic powers and elemental abilities who terrorized the Air Realm. Examples of his psychic and elemental powers involved electrocuting Prince Eccentro with lightning and using a wind attack on Batch. Before it can use its abilities on Gluko, Tenaka got in the way and ended up frozen in ice.
 Winged Yeti (White Yeti in the Japanese version) - An egg shaped Light-elemental with tiny wings, living high in the mountains and is an expert giant slayer.
 Grimbat - Small demon-like creatures who cause bad luck, varying from people making bad decisions to explosions. It is revealed that one of them was behind Prince Eccentro's bad luck.
 Volcanu - A rock giant with lava for blood.
 Water Sprite - A female form with fins for ears and a fish tail, entirely made out of water. She can take any form of water.
 Zap the Eel Monster - A giant electric eel monster.
 Scorch the Fire Monster - A fiery beast.
 Dobe Rats - These small rat monsters attack in groups.
 Viperess (Kowataru in the Japanese version) - A powerful winged-viper monster that was sealed away by ancient warriors in a domino structure.
 Emu - Just a normal emu, but with super-speed.
 Giant Squid - A giant squid that attacks with its tentacles.
 Aquagon the Sea King - A sea giant with teal hair who rules Mon World's seas.
 Horned Beetle - A giant beetle monster.
 Mastodon -
 Giant Boar -
 Spiky Giant Ape -
 Giant Mole -
 Giant Tapeworm -
 Lemming - Tiny white mouse-like creatures, without tail. The strength of one is determined by how many Lemmings are around.
 Purple Sheep (Silent Sheep in the Japanese version) - Lambda's kind. They are regular sheep except for being purple.
 Elephant Monster - A big elephant with red eyes.
 Basailosaurus - A Dimetrodon-type monster.
 Pearl Princess - A mermaid who lives in the Water Realm. She can create a shield which reflects other monsters' attacks including the monsters themselves.
 White Dolphin - A dolphin-like creature.
 Ogopogo - A giant deep sea fish with a vicious nature.
 Tyrannous - A lava Tyrannosaurus monster.
 Baseball Giant - A baseball-themed giant.
 Diamond Star - A star-headed monster that was on Eccentro's baseball team.
 Speedy Hedgehog - A fast hedgehog who was on Eccentro's baseball team.
 Hurricane Eagle - A large eagle.
 Lotocus (Diplodocus in the Japanese version) - A Diplodocus-type monster that is colored entirely white.
 Zazeus - A demon who is also known as "The Storm King" and Dragowrath's mortal enemy (a wind elemental in the Japanese dub, evil in the original version).
 Dragowrath - A giant dragon who is also known as "The Giant Dragon King of the Winds" and Zazeus' mortal enemy. When he and Zazeus are released, they create powerful winds which destroys the forest in the Wind Realm.
 Forest Fearies - Tiny butterfly winged faeries who guard the key to awakening Zazeus and Dragowrath. It seems that they are distrustful of strangers.
 Tiamat the Dragon Empress - The Queen of all Dragons with the upper body of a warrior woman. She resides in the ocean bordering the Water Realm and the Realm of Evil.
 Ten-Armed Scorpula - A ferocious giant-like monster with ten arms who is under a sleeping spell to keep him from wreaking havoc.
 Emerald Dragon - A green, spiky dragon that is similar to Ankylosaurus.
 Crikey the Crocodile Monster - A giant crocodile.
 Lizard Men - A race of reptilian humanoids that live in a swamp village.
 Chameldragon - A tiny winged dragon that can increase its size.
 Grendel (a.k.a. Beowulf) -
 Miners - Dwarf-like men who are grizzled and spend their days mining, hence the name. They don't like Slobgonians very much.
 Stone Giant - A giant made of stone.
 Giant Sunbird - A four-winged sunbird summoned by Luke to help the Mon Colle Knight fight the Stone Giant.
 Sun Devil - A living fireball with a face.
 Boom Dragon - A large and obese orange dragon whose stomach is apparently a bomb and its tail is a fuse.
 Lava Lizard - A large purple dinosaur-creature that can turn into lava and move through the ground this way.
 Kiki the Cleaning Monster - A rabbit-like monster who uses a magical broom to clean anything.
 Bone Dragon - A skeletal dragon monster that can reassemble if dismantled by an attack. Only a magical creature can defeat it.
 Hippopotamus Monster - A hippopotamus monster that looks like a giant pink piggy bank with tiny wings.
 Taurus Ogre -
 Fire Dragon - A ruby-red dragon similar to an oriental dragon in form. He is witty, but also very intelligent.
 Extreme Fire Dragon (Final Fire Dragon in the Japanese version) - Fire Dragon's evolved form that resembles a bipedal dragon with wings.
 Giant Sandworm - A giant sandworm found in the Earth Realm. It is by far the largest monster in the series. Supposedly it was invincible, but was still beaten by the Fire Dragon.
 Daemond - A giant demon summoned by Redda. He proved more than a match for the Fire Dragon, but was overwhelmed and killed by the Extreme Fire Dragon.
 Gargoyles - A race of Jersey Devil-like creatures. The Gargoyles are Redda's minions in the Realm of Evil.
 Winged Destroyer - A fearsome giant black bird that is one of Redda's minions in the Realm of Evil.
 Questing Beast -
 Dread Dragon - A darkness dragon. It has a giant eye thing on a long neck that shoots deadly beams. Killed by Gabriolis when Mondo and Rockna merged with him. Redda later revived the Dread Dragon in order to be a host for Oroboros.
 Oroboros - A formless creature referred to as "Time Master". It was released by Redda who used the Mon-World items for this and it took possession of the dead form of the Dread Dragon.
 Doomsday Dragon (Apocalypse Dragon in the Japanese version) - Oroboros incarnated into the Dread Dragon. One of his eyes reverts time and the other speeds up time. Redda intended to use him to destroy Mon-World. He was too-powerful even for the four evolved dragons, the six elemental angels, and the Mon Colle Knights combined. When the Golden Dragon was summoned and had all of the elements channeled into him, he destroyed the Doomsday Dragon and forced Oroboros back into his own realm.
 Golden Dragon (Saint Star Dragon in the Japanese version) - The most powerful monster in Mon World that was prophesied to appear when it was needed and did so when summoned by angels to stop Doomsday Dragon. All elements, including "Evil" were channeled into him to defeat the Doomsday Dragon.

Mon World Realms
These are the six realms of Mon World:

 Earth Realm - A realm that is partially desert and forest. Home-realm to the Earth Angel and Earth-based monsters.
 Wind Realm - A windy realm that is home to the Cloud Angel and Wind-based monsters. Sky City floats here.
 Fire Realm - A realm filled with volcanoes, lava pits, and hot springs. Home-realm to the Fire Angel and Fire-based monsters.
 Water Realm - A realm that is mostly oceans with islands. Home-realm to the Angel of all Oceans and Water-based monsters.
 Light Realm (a.k.a. Holy Realm) - A realm that's home to Spectra the Angel and other Light-based monsters.
 Darkness Realm (a.k.a. Demon Realm) - A realm filled with Darkness-based monsters. Gabriolis, Lucca and Redda live here.

Episodes
Note: The titles for the Japanese version and the summaries are taken from Discotek Media's upload to Crunchyroll.

Staff

Japanese crew
 Original Setting: Hitoshi Yasuda / Group SNE
 Original Story: Satoru Akahori + Hasegawa Katsumi
 General Creation: Satoru Akahori
 Series Composition: Hasegawa Katsumi
 Original Characters: Hideaki Nishikawa
 Character Design: Atsuko Nakajima
 Director: Yasunao Aoki
 Mechanical Design: Aoki Tomoyoshi
 Item Design: Yamagata Atsushi
 Production Design: Miyazaki Shiniti
 Art Director: Akutsu Mitiyo + Motoki Nagayoshi Yuki
 Color Design: Takeshi Mochida
 Director of Photography: Okino Masahide
 Music: Hiroshi Sakamoto
 Sound Director: Tanaka Kazuya
 Producer: Higashi Fukashi + Ikeda Shin'ichi + Noguchi Kazunori
 Production: TV Tokyo, Yomiko, Studio Deen

English crew
 Tony Oliver: Voice Director
 Scott Page-Pagter: Voice Director
 Michael Sorich: Voice Director

Adaptations

Card games
Group SNE developed the game based on the series.
 Mon-Colle-Knight official card game
 Mon-Colle-Knight official card game powerup card set 1

Video games
 Mumon Tengai Monokore Knight GB ("Mon-Colle-Knight GB") (Game Boy color)

References

External links
 Group SNE's Mon-Colle-Knight product list
 TV.com Mon Colle Knights Episode Guide
 

2000 anime television series debuts
2000 manga
Japanese children's animated adventure television series
Japanese children's animated fantasy television series
Adventure anime and manga
Discotek Media
Fantasy anime and manga
Fox Kids
Fox Broadcasting Company original programming
Shōnen manga
Studio Deen
TV Tokyo original programming
Kadokawa Shoten manga
Kadokawa Dwango franchises
Satoru Akahori